Urban is an unincorporated community in Skagit County, in the U.S. state of Washington.

History
A post office called Urban was established in 1895, and remained in operation until 1971. The community was named after Urban Stenger.

References

Unincorporated communities in Skagit County, Washington
Unincorporated communities in Washington (state)